American singer and actress Jennifer Lopez has been featured in forty-six music videos and has released three video albums. Lopez's first music video was for "Baila", from the soundtrack of the movie Music of the Heart. She later ventured into a musical career, and her first video was for "If You Had My Love" from her debut album On the 6. Directed by Paul Hunter, the video was known for its theme of voyeurism. The third single's video for "Waiting for Tonight" was famed for its theme of counting down to the new year with this case being the new millennium.
Lopez's videos are well known for having dance breaks, including her music videos for "If You Had My Love" (1999) and "Love Don't Cost a Thing" (2000)—she brought back dance breaks in her later music videos for "I'm Into You" and "Papi" (2011). Lopez's music video for "I'm Glad" (from her third studio album This Is Me... Then) was described as one of the more "complicated" videos which recreated scenes from a 1983 film Flashdance. "I'm Into You" was praised, Kyle Anderson from Entertainment Weekly applauded her natural beauty and said "that time-out at the three-quarters mark is as sharp as any diva dance break you’ll see." In her music video for "Papi", Lopez consumes a chocolate chip cookie which will allow her "love" to come back, given to her by her apartment mail attendant; she takes too large a bite, resulting in the magic of the cookie to become effective—groups of men chase her around town until her true love finds her.

Lopez was ranked at number twenty-one on VH1's "50 Greatest Women of the Video Era" list. Throughout her music videos, she has worked with several directors and choreographers, including working with Paul Hunter, Francis Lawrence and Dave Meyers several times. She is considered a sex symbol through her music videos. The music video for "I'm Glad" briefly led to a lawsuit for copyright infringement for re-creating scenes from the 1983 film, Flashdance, which was later dismissed.

Music videos

Guest appearances

Video albums

See also 
 Sex symbol

Notes

References 

Lopez, Jennifer
Works by Jennifer Lopez